Keaton Alexander Parks (born August 6, 1997) is an American professional soccer player who plays as a midfielder for Major League Soccer club New York City FC.

Club career
Born in Plano, Texas, Parks played soccer three years with Liberty High School in Frisco before joining NPSL side Liverpool Warriors. With the help of his coach, Parks managed to trial at several Portuguese clubs such as Benfica, Braga and Sporting Lisbon. While playing with the Warriors during a tournament in Póvoa de Varzim, Parks was scouted and signed with Varzim. In signing for Varzim, Parks rejected an offer to attend Southern Methodist University and play for their soccer team.

After playing for Varzim's reserve side for a season, Parks made his professional debut for the club in a LigaPro match on September 4, 2016 against Aves. He came on as an 83rd-minute substitute for Diego Barcelos as Varzim lost 2–0. Parks then established himself as a regular starter for the side and then scored his first two professional goals during two matches. The first goal came on December 17, 2016 against Famalicão. His 52nd-minute strike was the first of two as Varzim won 2–0. His second goal came in the next match on December 21 against Fafe. His 69th-minute goal was the equalizer for Varzim as they eventually won the match 2–1.

On July 25, 2017, Parks signed with Portuguese champions Benfica, joining its reserve team in LigaPro. His first appearance for the senior team came in the 71st minute of the fourth round of the Taça de Portugal, against Vitória in November that year. Later, on December 6, Parks signed a new contract with Benfica, keeping him at the club until 2022.

On January 19, 2019, Parks joined Major League Soccer side New York City FC on loan until the end of their 2019 season. The deal to New York City FC was made permanent by the club on January 8, 2020.

International career
Parks has been involved with the United States national under-20 team, attending a training camp in London in April 2017. He received his first senior call-up for a friendly against Bolivia on May 28, 2018, making his debut in that match as a 61st-minute substitute for Joe Corona.

Career statistics

Club

International

Honors
New York City FC
MLS Cup: 2021
Campeones Cup: 2022

References

External links
 
 MLS player profile

1997 births
Living people
Sportspeople from Plano, Texas
Soccer players from Texas
American soccer players
Association football midfielders
Varzim S.C. players
S.L. Benfica B players
S.L. Benfica footballers
New York City FC players
Liga Portugal 2 players
Primeira Liga players
Major League Soccer players
American expatriate sportspeople in Portugal
American expatriate soccer players
Expatriate footballers in Portugal
United States men's international soccer players
United States men's under-23 international soccer players